The 2014 Dunlop MSA Formula Ford Championship of Great Britain was a multi-event, open-wheel single seater motor racing championship held across England and Scotland. The championship featured a mix of professional motor racing teams and privately funded drivers, competing in Formula Ford cars that conformed to the technical regulations for the championship. This, the 38th British Formula Ford season, was the second year of the single class format, with all drivers using the latest cars built to the Formula Ford EcoBoost specification. There was also an award for the highest placed Rookie. Part of the TOCA tour, it formed part of the extensive program of support categories built up around the BTCC centrepiece. The season commenced on 30 March at Brands Hatch – on the circuit's Indy configuration – and concluded on 12 October at the same venue, utilising the Grand Prix circuit, after 30 races held at 10 meetings, all in support of the 2014 British Touring Car Championship season.

The championship was won by South African driver Jayde Kruger of the JTR team, finishing six points clear of Falcon Motorsport's Harrison Scott. Kruger won the most races during the season with 13 (to Scott's 5), but Scott's greater consistency – 24 podiums from 30 races – compared to Kruger (17 podiums) allowed him to remain in contention entering the final round at Brands Hatch, as both drivers entered the weekend with 651 points apiece. Scott won the first race to take the championship lead, before the two drivers collided on the second lap of race two. Kruger went on to win the race, while Scott failed to finish. Falcon Motorsport protested the result, before a JTR counter-appeal allowed the race result to stand as it was. Thus, Kruger's eighth place finish in the final race was enough for the championship, despite Scott winning. Falcon Motorsport again contested the result, with the case being heard at the court of appeal, for the Motor Sports Association. Kruger was confirmed champion in November after Falcon's protest was rejected.

The battle for third place in the championship was equally fraught, with a quartet of drivers being split by 11 points at season's end. Top Scholarship class runner Ashley Sutton, a five-time race winner for MBM Motorsport, was the victor in the battle; he finished six points clear of Radical Motorsport's Juan Rosso, who took his only win during the season at Thruxton. Rosso himself finished a point clear of Kruger's team-mate Max Marshall, who won a pair of races at Snetterton and Rockingham respectively. James Abbott, another Radical Motorsport driver, was also a two-time winner, and he finished sixth in the drivers' championship, taking wins at the opening Brands Hatch meeting and Croft. The only other winner, with two wins, was Sam Brabham for JTR, before his season was cut short due to budgetary issues; he had won two of the three races to be held at Thruxton. Sutton was a comfortable winner of the Scholarship class along with his third place overall finish, finishing almost 200 points clear of his next best class rival, Ricky Collard, Scott's team-mate at Falcon Motorsport. The Teams' Cup was won by JTR, despite Falcon Motorsport closing in at the final round; JTR were still able to finish clear by 33 points, while the Nations' Cup was won by South Africa, on the basis of Kruger's results.

Championship changes
To bring the championship into line with many other junior single seater championships, series organisers announced that the second race of each meeting would be held with a partially reversed grid.

Teams and drivers

Race calendar and results
The provisional calendar was announced on 14 September 2013, with no major changes from 2013. All races were held in the United Kingdom.

Championship standings

Drivers' Championship

References

External links
 The home of the British Formula Ford Championship

British Formula Ford Championship seasons
Formula Ford
British Formula Ford